This is a list of the Provosts of Oriel College, Oxford. The Provost is the college's principal, responsible for its academic leadership, chairing its governing body, and representing it in the outside world.

1326 to 1332: Adam de Brome – Almoner to Edward II and founder of college.
1332 to 1348: William de Leverton	
1348 to 1349: William de Hawkesworth – also a Vice-Chancellor of the University of Oxford.
1349 to 1373: William de Daventre
1373 to 1385: John de Colyntre
1385 to 1394: John de Middleton
1394 to 1402: John de Maldon
1402 to 1414: John Possell
1414 to 1415: John Rote
1415 to 1417: William Corffe
1417 to 1421: Thomas Leyntwardyn
1421 to 1422: Henry Kayle
1424 to 1427: Nicholas Herry
1428 to 1435: John Carpenter
1435 to 1446: Walter Lyhert
1446 to 1449: John Hals
1449 to 1476: Henry Sampson
1476 to 1479: Thomas Hawkyns
1479 to 1492: John Taylor
1493 to 1507: Thomas Cornysh
1507 to 1516: Edmund Wylsford – also a Vice-Chancellor of the University of Oxford.
1516 to 1530: James More
1530 to 1538: Thomas Ware
1538 to 1540: Henry Mynne
1540 to 1550: William Haynes
1550 to 1565: John Smyth
1565 to 1566: Roger Marbeck – Chief physician to Elizabeth I.
1566 to 1574: John Belly
1574 to 1618: Antony Blencowe
1618 to 1621: William Lewis
1621 to 1644: John Tolson
1644 to 1653: John Saunders
1653 to 1691: Robert Say
1691 to 1708: George Royse
1709 to 1727: George Carter
1727 to 1757: Walter Hodges
1757 to 1768: Chardin Musgrave
1768 to 1781: John Clarke	
1781 to 1814: John Eveleigh	
1814 to 1828: Edward Copleston – Oxford Professor of Poetry 1802–1812, Bishop of Llandaff and Dean of St Paul's 1828–1849.
1828 to 1882: Edward Hawkins	
1882 to 1905: David Binning Monro – Scottish Homeric scholar.
1905 to 1914: Charles Lancelot Shadwell	
1914 to 1930: Lancelot Ridley Phelps	
1930 to 1947: David Ross – Scottish philosopher, known for work in ethics.
1947 to 1957: George Clark – British historian.
1957 to 1980: Kenneth Turpin – Vice-Chancellor of the University of Oxford 1966–1969.
1980 to 1981: Michael Swann – molecular and cell biologist, Chairman of the BBC (1973–80), Principal of the University of Edinburgh (1973–80), and Chancellor of the University of York (1979–90). 	
1982 to 1990: Zelman Cowen – former Governor-General of Australia
1990 to 2003: Ernest Nicholson – former Oriel Professor of the Interpretation of Holy Scripture
2003 to 2013: Derek Morris – former Chairman of the Competition Commission
2013 to 2018: Moira Wallace, former British civil servant, first Permanent Secretary of the Department of Energy and Climate Change.
2018 (current): Neil Mendoza, entrepreneur, publisher and philanthropist.

References

Oriel
Oriel